By Dom Kennedy is the third studio album by American rapper Dom Kennedy. The album was released on June 2, 2015. The album features the lone guest appearance from Bonic of Philly's Most Wanted.

Commercial performance
The album debuted at number 23 on the Billboard 200, selling 9,000 copies.

Track listing

Notes
"What I Tell Kids" features additional vocals from Bonic
"2Bad" features additional vocals from Tish Hyman

Charts

Weekly charts

Year-end charts

References

2015 albums
Dom Kennedy albums
Albums produced by Jake One
Albums produced by DJ Dahi